Multilingual Multiscript Plant Name Database (MMPND) is a multilingual database of names of taxa of plants.

The MMPND is located at the University of Melbourne, managed, and maintained by Michel H. Porcher. This database includes the names of taxa of more than 900 genera of higher plants (not counting mushrooms). In addition to the scientific names and synonyms, it contains the terms of the taxa in 82 languages (The website states it has 70, with 40 or more dialects included).

The MMPND is mentioned in many taxa of GRIN-Global (Germplasm Resources Information Network), "References" as a: Porcher, M. H. et al. Searchable World Wide Web Multilingual Multiscript Plant Name Database (MMPND) (on-line resource). (Pl Names)

The International Plant Names Index (IPNI) mentions: "Multilingual Multiscript Plant Name Database is searchable in any language and script and holds a lot of information including an index of medicinal plants".

The stated aims of MMPND are the following: 

"... the intention is to cover as many useful plants as possible. What is useful in one part of the world, however, can be a weed, even a noxious weed, in another. Our political stance is that, whether it is a selection or a species, if it is declared useful by some people, provided that we can get a minimum of information about it and that we can handle the data, it is in. We basically foresee 8 categories of plants. In order of decreasing importance, we will consider Vegetables, Cereals, Fruits, Mushrooms / Fungi, Herbs, Pasture / Fodder Crops, Medicinal plants, and what may be termed "Utilitarian crops" such as fiber, oil crops, stimulants, etc. We feel that in the last fifty years, the first 3 categories have been attracting far too little attention from taxonomists, especially below the species level. These three groups of edible plants include all the world's staple foods and their related cultivars and selections. These have been bred and improved over centuries. They are the basic ingredients of the world ethnic cuisines ...".

The first objective was to focus on useful plants, the cultivated ones. Still, the database currently contains the names of plants of economic importance as well as names of savage plants. For each genus, the last update is indicated.

These multilingual names are presented by genera, as follows:

Gymnosperms and angiosperms
 Lists of names, General part: Angiosperms (and some few repeated genera of Gymnosperms) (570 genera).
 Conifers, Gymnosperms (75 genera).

Other sections
 Bamboos (65 genera).
 Palms (Palms and Cycads)(173 genera).
 Medicinal plants (42 plus genera not covered in other sections).
 Fungi (Fungi, Mushrooms)(54 genera)

Indexes of plant names in various languages.

Examples of citations
en: Abutilon, Allium chinense, Amaranthus tricolor, Banana, Beetroot, Orange, Beta vulgaris, Black-eyed pea, Blood banana, ... (and until 95 citations).

ca: Asparagus, Blat de moro dolç, Cantalup, Citrus unshiu, Cupressus, Drago , Enciam, Multilingüisme, Rave blanc, Remolatxa d'hort, Thymus. (and until 11 citations).

de: Adzukibohne, AfrikanischerTulpenbaum, Bananen, Bay, Canarium luzonicum, Dioscorea rotundata, Durian, ... (and until 34 citations).

es: Actinorhytis, Aleurites moluccanus, Annona cherimola, Annona muricata, Areca catechu, Borassus aethiopum, Brassica rapa subsp. narinosa, ...  (and until 27 citations).

fr: Acacia gummifera, Aspects culturels de la pomme de terre, Betterave potagère, Bunium bulbocastanum, Cavendish (bananier), Châtaigne d'eau chinoise, Chicoréepain de sucre, ... (and until 28 citations).

External links
 Multilingual Multiscript Plant Name Database (Official website)

References

Online botany databases
Databases in Australia